Abdou Darboe (born 22 December 1990) is a Gambian football striker who last plays for Abahani Limited Dhaka.

Career
He played for Armed Forces Banjul before transferring on 27 April 2009 to Hønefoss BK. He left Hønefoss on 10 February 2011 and signed for FK Tønsberg. After two years with FK Tønsberg he signed for Bredaryds IK in Sweden.

International career
He has been capped three times for the Gambian national team.

References

1990 births
Living people
Gambian footballers
The Gambia international footballers
Gambian expatriate footballers
Gambian expatriate sportspeople in Norway
Expatriate footballers in Norway
Hønefoss BK players
Mjøndalen IF players
FK Tønsberg players
Eliteserien players
Norwegian First Division players
Expatriate footballers in Sweden
Gambian expatriate sportspeople in Sweden
Abahani Limited (Dhaka) players
Association football forwards